Cardiff & Met Hockey Club, previously known as Cardiff & UWIC Hockey Club, is a field hockey club based at the Sport Wales National Centre in Sophia Gardens, Cardiff, Wales. They play in the Men's England Hockey League.

It was established in November, 1896 and today forms the hockey section of Cardiff Athletic Club with its headquarters at Cardiff Arms Park. The teams play at the Sport Wales National Centre and Cardiff Metropolitan University. It is one of the oldest sporting organisations in the whole of Wales.

History
 
 
The club was established in November 1896 as the Roath Hockey Club.

The club was one of the first hockey clubs in Cardiff. The first game was played on 5 December 1898, however within a few months the club had changed its name to Cardiff Hockey Club. The Club moved from its original ground at Roath Park to Llandaff Fields and the Whitchurch Polo Fields.

In 1920 when a ladies hockey club was formed, called Cardiff United. In 1927 the club became part of the Cardiff Athletic Club, and played under the name of Cardiff Athletic Ladies HC until 1939.

In May 1945 the Management Committee of Cardiff Athletic Club decided to form a Hockey Section by inviting the Cardiff Hockey Club to become a section of the Cardiff Athletic Club. Around 2008 the club merged with the University of Wales Institute Cardiff to form the Cardiff & UWIC Hockey Club, which later became the Cardiff Metropolitan University.

The home pitch is based at Sophia Gardens with training facilities at the Cardiff Metropolitan University.

See also
Sport in Cardiff

Notes

External links
Cardiff Athletic Club - Hockey section

Sport in Cardiff
Organisations based in Cardiff
Field hockey clubs established in 1896
Welsh field hockey clubs